Magpakailanman is a Philippine television drama anthology show broadcast by GMA Network. Hosted by Mel Tiangco, it premiered on December 2, 2002. The show concluded on December 27, 2007. It was replaced by the E.S.P. in its timeslot. The show returned on November 17, 2012 on the network's Sabado Star Power sa Gabi line up.

Overview
The show was originally created by GMA Entertainment TV Group as a limited drama special intended for the celebration of World Meeting of Families on January 23–24, 2003. Vilma Santos was offered to host the show but turned it down. Mel Tiangco was later hired to host and the show later became a regular show in GMA Network. On December 27, 2007, the show was canceled.

In November 2012, the show was revived by GMA Network, with Tiangco reprising her role as the host. In March 2020, principal photography was halted due to the enhanced community quarantine in Luzon caused by the COVID-19 pandemic. The show resumed its programming on July 18, 2020.

Ratings
According to AGB Nielsen Philippines' Mega Manila household television ratings, the pilot episode of the second run of Magpakailanman earned a 20.6% rating.

Accolades

References

External links 
 
 

2002 Philippine television series debuts
Filipino-language television shows
GMA Network original programming
Philippine anthology television series
Television productions suspended due to the COVID-19 pandemic
Television series revived after cancellation